

The following lists events that happened during 1937 in Afghanistan.

Incumbents
 Monarch – Mohammed Zahir Shah
 Prime Minister – Mohammad Hashim Khan

Events

 8 July - Treaty of Saadabad is signed between Afghanistan, Iran, Iraq, and Turkey. 
 The prime minister, Sardar Mohammad Hashim Khan, the uncle of the king, having gone to Berlin to undergo an operation, takes the opportunity before returning home to visit London, spending a week there as the guest of the government, and confirming Afghanistan's friendly relations with Britain.

References 

 
Afghanistan
Years of the 20th century in Afghanistan
Afghanistan
1930s in Afghanistan